Hum Bhi Insaan Hain (English: We are human too) is 1948 Bollywood film directed by Phani Majumdar and starring Dev Anand, Ramola Devi and Amir Banu. It was a success at the box office.

Cast
Dev Anand 			
Ramala Devi 	
Amir Banu 		
Niharika		
German 			
G. Das 			
Pal

References

External links
 

1948 films
1940s Hindi-language films
Films directed by Phani Majumdar
Indian drama films
1948 drama films
Indian black-and-white films
Hindi-language drama films